María Rivas (August 21, 1931 – January 14, 2013), was a Spanish television, film and stage actress. She worked with Televisa as an actress of telenovelas.

Filmography

Television

Films

References

External links 

1931 births
2013 deaths 
Spanish emigrants to Mexico
Mexican telenovela actresses
20th-century Mexican actresses
Mexican film actresses
Naturalized citizens of Mexico